The economy of the Soviet Union was based on  state ownership of the means of production, collective farming, and industrial manufacturing. An administrative-command system managed a distinctive form of central planning. The Soviet economy was characterized by state control of investment, a dependence on natural resources, shortages of many consumer goods, little foreign trade, public ownership of industrial assets, macroeconomic stability, negligible unemployment and high job security.

Beginning in 1930, the course of the economy of the Soviet Union was guided by a series of five-year plans. By the 1950s, the Soviet Union had rapidly evolved from a mainly agrarian society into a major industrial power. Its transformative capacity meant communism consistently appealed to the intellectuals of developing countries in Asia. Impressive growth rates during the first three five-year plans (1928–1940) are particularly notable given that this period is nearly congruent with the Great Depression. During this period, the Soviet Union saw rapid industrial growth while other regions were suffering from crisis. The White House National Security Council of the United States described the continuing growth as a "proven ability to carry backward countries speedily through the crisis of modernization and industrialization", and the impoverished base upon which the five-year plans sought to build meant that at the commencement of Operation Barbarossa in 1941 the country was still poor. 

A major strength of the Soviet economy was its enormous supply of oil and gas, which became much more valuable as exports after the world price of oil skyrocketed in the 1970s. As Daniel Yergin notes, the Soviet economy in its final decades was "heavily dependent on vast natural resources–oil and gas in particular". World oil prices collapsed in 1986, putting heavy pressure on the economy. After Mikhail Gorbachev became the General Secretary of the Communist Party of the Soviet Union and came to power in 1985, he began a process of economic liberalization by dismantling the command economy and moving towards a mixed economy modeled after Lenin's New Economic Policy. At its dissolution at the end of 1991, the Soviet Union begat a Russian Federation with a growing pile of $66 billion in external debt and with barely a few billion dollars in net gold and foreign exchange reserves.

The complex demands of the modern economy somewhat constrained the central planners. Corruption and data fiddling became common practice among the bureaucracy by reporting fulfilled targets and quotas, thus entrenching the crisis. From the Stalin-era to the early Brezhnev-era, the Soviet economy grew much slower than Japan and slightly faster than the United States. GDP levels in 1950 (in billion 1990 dollars) were 510 (100%) in the Soviet Union, 161 (100%) in Japan and 1,456 (100%) in the United States. By 1965, the corresponding values were 1,011 (198%), 587 (365%) and 2,607 (179%). The Soviet Union maintained itself as the world's second largest economy in both nominal and purchasing power parity values throughout the Cold War, when Japan's economy exceeded $3 trillion in nominal value.

The Soviet Union's relatively small consumer sector accounted for just under 60% of the country's GDP in 1990 while the industrial and agricultural sectors contributed 22% and 20% respectively in 1991. Agriculture was the predominant occupation in the Soviet Union before the massive industrialization under Soviet general secretary Joseph Stalin. The service sector was of low importance in the Soviet Union, with the majority of the labor force employed in the industrial sector. The labor force totaled 152.3 million people. Though its GDP crossed $1 trillion in the 1970s and $2 trillion in the 1980s, the effects of central planning were progressively distorted due to the rapid growth of the black market informal second economy in the Soviet Union.

Planning 

Based on a system of state ownership, the Soviet economy was managed through Gosplan (the State Planning Commission), Gosbank (the State Bank) and the Gossnab (State Commission for Materials and Equipment Supply). Beginning in 1928, the economy was directed by a series of five-year plans, with a brief attempt at seven-year planning. For every enterprise, planning ministries (also known as the "fund holders" or fondoderzhateli) defined the mix of economic inputs (e.g. labor and raw materials), a schedule for completion, all wholesale prices and almost all retail prices. The planning process was based around material balances—balancing economic inputs with planned output targets for the planning period. From 1930 until the late 1950s, the range of mathematics used to assist economic decision-making was, for ideological reasons, extremely restricted. On the whole, the plans were overoptimistic and plagued by falsified reporting.

The industry was long concentrated after 1928 on the production of capital goods through metallurgy, machine manufacture, and chemical industry. In Soviet terminology, goods were known as capital. This emphasis was based on the perceived necessity for very fast industrialization and modernization of the Soviet Union. After the death of Joseph Stalin in 1953, consumer goods (group B goods) received somewhat more emphasis due to the efforts of Georgy Malenkov. However, when Nikita Khrushchev consolidated his power by sacking Malenkov, one of the accusations against him was that he permitted "theoretically incorrect and politically harmful opposition to the rate of development of heavy industry in favor of the rate of development of light and food industry". Since 1955, the priorities were again given to capital goods, which was expressed in the decisions of the 20th Congress of the Communist Party of the Soviet Union (CPSU) in 1956.

Economist Naum Jasny says that while many of the official statistics were correctly reported:
The fact is that the most important official general indices of economic development – those of national income, industrial output, real incomes of wage-earners and peasants, labour productivity and production costs in industry – have, over long periods of time....nothing in common with reality.  

Most information in the Soviet economy flowed from the top down. There were several mechanisms in place for producers and consumers to provide input and information that would help in the drafting of economic plans (as detailed below), but the political climate was such that few people ever provided negative input or criticism of the plan and thus Soviet planners had very little reliable feedback that they could use to determine the success of their plans. This meant that economic planning was often done based on faulty or outdated information, particularly in sectors with large numbers of consumers. As a result, some goods tended to be underproduced and led to shortages while other goods were overproduced and accumulated in storage. Low-level managers often did not report such problems to their superiors, relying instead on each other for support. Some factories developed a system of barter and either exchanged or shared raw materials and parts without the knowledge of the authorities and outside the parameters of the economic plan.

Heavy industry was always the focus of the Soviet economy even in its later years. The fact that it received special attention from the planners, combined with the fact that industrial production was relatively easy to plan even without minute feedback, led to significant growth in that sector. The Soviet Union became one of the leading industrial nations of the world. Industrial production was disproportionately high in the Soviet Union compared to Western economies. However, the production of consumer goods was disproportionately low. Economic planners made little effort to determine the wishes of household consumers, resulting in severe shortages of many consumer goods. Whenever these consumer goods would become available on the market, consumers routinely had to stand in long lines (queues) to buy them. A black market developed for goods such as cigarettes that were particularly sought after, but it constantly underproduced. People were developing unique social "networks of favors" between people having access to sought after goods (for example, working in particular shops or factories).

Drafting the five-year plans 
Under Joseph Stalin's  close supervision,  a complex system of planning arrangements had developed since the introduction of the first five-year plan in 1928. Until the late 1980s and early 1990s, when economic reforms backed by Soviet leader Mikhail Gorbachev introduced significant changes in the traditional system (see perestroika), the allocation of resources was directed by a planning apparatus rather than through the interplay of market forces.

Time frame 
From the Stalin era through the late 1980s, the five-year plan integrated short-range planning into a longer time frame. It delineated the chief thrust of the country's economic development and specified the way the economy could meet the desired goals of the Communist Party of the Soviet Union. Although the five-year plan was enacted into law, it contained a series of guidelines rather than a set of direct orders.

Periods covered by the five-year plans coincided with those covered by the gatherings of the CPSU Party Congress. At each CPSU Congress, the party leadership presented the targets for the next five-year plan, therefore each plan had the approval of the most authoritative body of the country's leading political institution.

Guidelines for the plan 
The Central Committee of the CPSU and more specifically its Politburo set basic guidelines for planning. The Politburo determined the general direction of the economy via control figures (preliminary plan targets), major investment projects (capacity creation) and general economic policies. These guidelines were submitted as a report of the Central Committee to the Congress of the CPSU to be approved there. After the approval at the Congress, the list of priorities for the five-year plan was processed by the Council of Ministers, which constituted the government of the Soviet Union. The Council of Ministers was composed of industrial ministers, chairmen of various state committees and chairmen of agencies with ministerial status. This committee stood at the apex of the vast economic administration, including the state planning apparatus, the industrial ministries, the trusts (the intermediate level between the ministries and the enterprises) and finally the state enterprises. The Council of Ministers elaborated on Politburo plan targets and sent them to Gosplan, which gathered data on plan fulfillment.

Gosplan 

Combining the broad goals laid out by the Council of Ministers with data supplied by lower administrative levels regarding the current state of the economy, Gosplan worked out through trial and error a set of preliminary plan targets. Among more than twenty state committees, Gosplan headed the government's planning apparatus and was by far the most important agency in the economic administration. The task of planners was to balance resources and requirements to ensure that the necessary inputs were provided for the planned output. The planning apparatus alone was a vast organizational arrangement consisting of councils, commissions, governmental officials, specialists and so on charged with executing and monitoring economic policy.

The state planning agency was subdivided into its own industrial departments, such as coal, iron and machine building. It also had summary departments such as finance, dealing with issues that crossed functional boundaries. With the exception of a brief experiment with regional planning during the Khrushchev era in the 1950s, Soviet planning was done on a sectoral basis rather than on a regional basis. The departments of the state planning agency aided the agency's development of a full set of plan targets along with input requirements, a process involving bargaining between the ministries and their superiors.  Economic ministries performed key roles in the Soviet organizational structure. When the planning goals had been established by Gosplan, economic ministries drafted plans within their jurisdictions and disseminated planning data to the subordinate enterprises. The planning data were sent downward through the planning hierarchy for progressively more detailed elaboration. The ministry received its control targets, which were then disaggregated by branches within the ministry, then by lower units, eventually until each enterprise received its own control figures (production targets). 

Enterprises were called upon to develop in the final period of state planning in the late 1980s and early 1990s (even though such participation was mostly limited to a rubber-stamping of prepared statements during huge pre-staged meetings). The enterprises' draft plans were then sent back up through the planning ministries for review. This process entailed intensive bargaining, with all parties seeking the target levels and input figures that best suited their interests.

After this bargaining process, Gosplan received the revised estimates and re-aggregated them as it saw fit. The redrafted plan was then sent to the Council of Ministers and the party's Politburo and Central Committee Secretariat for approval. The Council of Ministers submitted the plan to the Supreme Soviet of the Soviet Union and the Central Committee submitted the plan to the party congress, both for rubber stamp approval. By this time, the process had been completed and the plan became law.

The review, revision and approval of the five-year plan were followed by another downward flow of information, this time with the amended and final plans containing the specific targets for each sector of the economy. Implementation began at this point and was largely the responsibility of enterprise managers.

The national state budget was prepared by the Ministry of Finance of the Soviet Union by negotiating with its all-Union local organizations. If the state budget was accepted by the Soviet Union, it was then adopted.

According to a number of scholars both inside and outside of USSR, it was specifically Soviet-type economic planning combined with political dogmatism which led to gradual degradation of Soviet economy and its collapse.

Agriculture 

In the USSR, agriculture was organized into a system of collective farms (kolkhozes) and state farms (sovkhozes). These farms were collectivized distributed amongst the peasantry and yearly production quotas were set by administrators. Before Stalin, Soviet agriculture held its own. Data from the 1920s infers a positive supply response to increases in the terms of trade. Farmers increased grain sales to urban areas when the price of grain increased. However, at the time, agricultural production was limited by technology, as the whole of Soviet Agriculture relied heavily on animal powered tilling. In the 1930s due to massive famines and animal die offs, the number of remaining animals doing farm work was reduced by half. This indicated the dire need of additional production outputs, which administrators predicted could be supplied by mechanical harvesters. The planning of Soviet leadership emphasized a mechanical agricultural industry, whereby technology and ideology met to create a booming agricultural industry. This way, the technological evolution of Soviet agricultural production could be linked to urban industry. Yet in reality, Soviet planners were more invested in industry than farmers, and the Soviet agricultural industry suffered as a result.

Stalin's first Five year Plan (1929-1933) was a colossal failure. Soviet population declined after 1933, and would see modest growth until 1936. The figures suggest a gap of about 15 million people between anticipated population and those that survived the five-year plan. Systemic inefficiencies plagued Soviet agriculture, such as obsolete technology, waste of fuel resources, and depreciating capital stock. These inefficiencies clogged the Soviet agricultural machine and reduced output. Additionally, climate greatly affected Soviet agricultural output. Many regions throughout the USSR had little rainfall, short growing seasons, low temperatures, and general extremes unsuitable for optimal agricultural production. This was detrimental to agricultural output and prevented cost minimization. When harvests fell short of production quotas due to a sudden frost or long drought, Soviet output could not make up the difference. Consequently, when agriculture was not producing as promised, some peasants refused to work over fear of starvation. However, since Soviet farms were collectivized, no individual grievances could be tolerated for the societal system to succeed. As a result, peasants unwilling to join kolkhozy were forced off of their land, which was then redistributed to other peasants.

Following previous agricultural failures, Khrushchev abandoned Stalin's agricultural model. He instead looked comparatively at American agriculture through Soviet observers. He noticed that American agriculture flourished due to its specialization and interdependence on other farmers for goods and services. Similarly, Soviet farms could specialize in the crop which was best suited for growing in their region, and surplus could be transported throughout the USSR to satisfy quotas and distribute to people who needed the food. Khrushchev himself tended to suggest his favorite crops such as corn for planters. Paired with a need to proselytize mechanized agriculture to nearby countries, the Khrushchev administration began a campaign for an optimistic future of mechanized Soviet agriculture. However, Khrushchev was not able to fulfill his promises, and this contributed to his rising unpopularity which culminated in his removal from power.

Following Khrushchev's leadership, Soviet agriculture's legacy was defined by patchwork that attempted to fix the mistakes of the previous administrations. Crop harvests, tractors, fertilizer, and capital investment were all increasing since 1955.  By 1965, the output of the Soviet worker was increasing, but still well below average for a developed country. Problems such as a scarcity of educated workers, saturation of unskilled workers and jobs made obsolete by technology, and poorly trained and educated farmers brought costs up and drove production down. These issues prevented the Soviet Union from producing enough food, as a lack of administration and management led to the mismanagement of farms and reduced worker productivity. From 1972 to 1986, the Soviet Union failed to produce more wheat than the Western European average. This failure to produce resulted in forced Soviet imports of food. Between 1961 and 1985, Soviet food imports from foreign producers cost a total of nearly 240 billion dollars. The root of this expense can be identified in the inefficiencies of the Soviet agricultural sector, such as the shortage of workers, lag in technology, or natural factors such as drought or frosts. Although the Soviet Union aimed to establish a mechanized agricultural giant, the shortcomings of Soviet agriculture put the sector behind other countries from the beginning. Soviet agriculture had the inability to meet basic consumer demands and expectations, requiring policy change culminating in the dissolution of the USSR in 1991.

Foreign trade and currency 

Largely self-sufficient, the Soviet Union traded little in comparison to its economic strength. However, trade with noncommunist countries increased in the 1970s as the government sought to compensate gaps in domestic production with imports.

In general, fuels, metals and timber were exported. Machinery, consumer goods and sometimes grain were imported. In the 1980s trade with the Council for Mutual Economic Assistance (COMECON) member states accounted for about half the country's volume of trade.

The Soviet rouble was non-convertible after 1932 (when trade in gold-convertible chervonets, introduced by Lenin in the New Economic Policy years, was suspended) until the late 1980s. It was impossible (both for citizens and state-owned businesses) to freely buy or sell foreign currency even though the "exchange rate" was set and published regularly. Buying or selling foreign currency on a black market was a serious crime until the late 1980s. Individuals who were paid from abroad (for example writers whose books were published abroad) normally had to spend their currency in a foreign-currency-only chain of state-owned Beryozka ("Birch-tree") stores. Once a free conversion of currency was allowed, the exchange rate plummeted from its official values by almost a factor of 10.

Overall, the banking system was highly centralized and fully controlled by a single state-owned Gosbank, responsive to the fulfillment of the government's economic plans. Soviet banks furnished short-term credit to state-owned enterprises.

Forms of property 
There were two basic forms of property in the Soviet Union: individual property and collective property. These differed greatly in their content and legal status. According to communist theory, capital (means of production) should not be individually owned, with certain negligible exceptions. In particular, after the end of a short period of the New Economic Policy and with collectivization completed, all industrial property and virtually all land were collective.

Land in rural areas was allotted for housing and some sustenance farming, and persons had certain rights to it, but it was not their property in full. In particular, in kolkhozes and sovkhozes there was a practice to rotate individual farming lots with collective lots. This resulted in situations where people would ameliorate, till and cultivate their lots carefully, adapting them to small-scale farming and in 5–7 years those lots would be swapped for kolkhoz ones, typically with exhausted soil due to intensive, large-scale agriculture . There was an extremely small number of remaining individual farmsteads (khutors; хутор), located in isolated rural areas in the Baltic states, Ukraine, Siberia and cossack lands.

Individual property 
To distinguish "capitalist" and "socialist" types of property ownership further, two different forms of individual property were recognized: private property (частная собственность, chastnaya sobstvennost) and personal property (личная собственность, lichnaya sobstvennost). The former encompassed capital (means of production) while the latter described everything else in a person's possession.

Collective property 
There were several forms of collective ownership, the most significant being state property, kolkhoz property and cooperative property. The most common forms of cooperative property were housing cooperatives (жилищные кооперативы) in urban areas, consumer cooperatives (потребительская кооперация, потребкооперация) and rural consumer societies (сельские потребительские общества, сельпо).

History 

See also History of the Soviet Union

Early development 
Both the Russian Soviet Federative Socialist Republic and later the Soviet Union were countries in the process of industrialization. For both, this development occurred slowly and from a low initial starting-point. Because of World War I (1914–1918), the Russian Revolution of 1917 and the ensuing Russian Civil War (1917–1922), industrial production had only managed to barely recover its 1913 level by 1926. By this time, about 18% of the population lived in non-rural areas, although only about 7.5% were employed in the non-agricultural sector. The remainder remained stuck in low-productivity agriculture.

David A. Dyker sees the Soviet Union of circa 1930 as in some ways a typical developing country, characterized by low capital-investment and with most of its population residing in the countryside. Part of the reason for low investment-rates lay in the inability to acquire capital from abroad. This in turn, resulted from the repudiation of the debts of the Russian Empire by the Bolsheviks in 1918 as well as from the worldwide financial troubles. Consequently, any kind of economic growth had to be financed by domestic savings.

The economic problems in agriculture were further exacerbated by natural conditions, such as long cold winters across the country, droughts in the south and acidic soils in the north. However, according to Dyker, the Soviet economy did have "extremely good" potential in the area of raw materials and mineral extraction, for example in the oil fields in Transcaucasia, and this, along with a small but growing manufacturing base, helped the Soviet Union avoid any kind of balance of payments problems.

New Economic Policy (1921–1929) 

By early 1921, it became apparent to the Bolsheviks that forced requisitioning of grain had resulted in low agricultural production and widespread opposition. As a result, the decision was made by Lenin and the Politburo to try an alternative approach. The so-called New Economic Policy (NEP) was approved at the 10th Congress of the Russian Communist Party (Bolsheviks).

Everything except "the commanding heights", as Lenin put it, of the economy would be privatized. The commanding heights included foreign trade, heavy industry, communication and transport among others. In practice this limited the private sector to artisan and agricultural production/trade. The NEP encountered strong resistance within the Bolshevik party. Lenin had to persuade communist skeptics that "state capitalism" was a necessary step in achieving communism, while he himself harbored suspicions that the policy could be abused by private businessmen ("NEPmen").

As novelist Andrei Platonov, among others, noted, the improvements were immediate. Rationing cards and queues, which had become hallmarks of war communism, had disappeared. However, due to prolonged war, low harvests, and several natural disasters the Soviet economy was still in trouble, particularly its agricultural sector. In 1921, widespread famine broke out in the Volga-Ural region. The Soviet government changed its previous course and allowed international relief to come in from abroad, and established a special committee chaired by prominent communists and non-communists alike. Despite this, an estimated five million people died in the famine.

Armenian Soviet Socialist Republic 
The Soviet-era republic's centralized economy forbade private ownership of property with an income. Privately owned farms in Armenia were collectivized and put under the control of the state starting in the late 1920s, however this was frequently met with vigorous opposition by the peasantry. During the same period (1929–1936), Armenia's industrialization process was also launched by the government.The socialist economic system and socialist ownership of the means of production, which come in two forms: state property and cooperative and collective-farm property, form the basis of the republic's economy. The legislation authorizes small private ventures of individual peasants and craftsmen based on their own labor and forbids the exploitation of the labor of others, in addition to the socialist system of economy, which is the major type of economy in the Republic. The official economic plan sets and directs the Republic's economic course. By 1935, the gross product of agriculture was 132% higher than that of 1928, and the gross product of industry was 650% more than that of 1928.However, the 1930s economic revolution came at a high price: it destroyed the conventional peasant family and village institution and caused many people who lived in the remote countryside to relocate to cities. As private enterprise was essentially brought under government control, it came to an end.

Stalinism 

Starting in 1928, the five-year plans began building a heavy industrial base at once in an underdeveloped economy without waiting years for capital to accumulate through the expansion of light industry, and without reliance on external financing. The New Economic Policy was rapidly abandoned and replaced by Stalinism. The country now became industrialized at a hitherto unprecedented pace, surpassing Germany's pace of industrialization in the 19th century and Japan's earlier in the 20th century.

After the reconstruction of the economy in the wake of the destruction caused by the Russian Civil War was completed and after the initial plans of further industrialization were fulfilled, the explosive growth slowed down until the period of Brezhnev stagnation in the 1970s and 1980s.

Led by the creation of NAMI and by the GAZ copy of the Ford Model A in 1929, industrialization came with the extension of medical services, which improved labor productivity. Campaigns were carried out against typhus, cholera and malaria; the number of physicians increased as rapidly as facilities and training would permit; and death and infant mortality rates steadily decreased.

1930–1970 

As weighed growth rates, economic planning performed very well during the early and mid-1930s, World War II-era mobilization, and for the first two decades of the postwar era. The Soviet Union became the world's leading producer of oil, coal, iron ore and cement; manganese, gold, natural gas and other minerals were also of major importance. However, information about the Soviet famine of 1932–1933 was suppressed by the Soviet authorities until perestroika.

To some estimations, in 1933 workers' real earnings sank on more than 11.4% from 1926 level, though it needs an adjustment due to elimination of unemployment and perks at work (such as inexpensive meals). Common and political prisoners in labor camps were forced to do unpaid labor and communists and Komsomol members were frequently "mobilized" for various construction projects. The German invasion of World War II inflicted punishing blows to the economy of the Soviet Union, with Soviet GDP falling 34% between 1940 and 1942. Industrial output did not recover to its 1940 level for almost a decade.

In 1961, a new redenominated Soviet rouble was issued with an exchange rate of £1 = Rbl 1. The rouble maintained exchange parity with sterling until the dissolution of the Soviet Union in 1991. After a new leadership, headed by Leonid Brezhnev, had come to power, attempts were made to revitalize the economy through economic reform. Starting in 1965, enterprises and organizations were made to rely on economic methods of profitable production, rather than follow orders from the state administration. By 1970, the Soviet economy had reached its zenith and was estimated at 60 percent of the size of the United States in terms of the estimated commodities (like steel and coal). In 1989, the official GDP of the Soviet Union was $2,500 billion while the GDP of the United States was $4,862 billion with per capita income figures as $8,700 and $19,800 respectively.

1970–1990 

The value of all consumer goods manufactured in 1972 in retail prices was about 118 billion roubles ($530 billion). The Era of Stagnation in the mid-1970s was triggered by the Nixon Shock and aggravated by the war in Afghanistan in 1979 and led to a period of economic standstill between 1979 and 1985. Soviet military buildup at the expense of domestic development kept the Soviet Union's GDP at the same level during the first half of the 1980s. The Soviet planned economy was not structured to respond adequately to the demands of the complex modern economy it had helped to forge. The massive quantities of goods produced often did not meet the needs or tastes of consumers.

The volume of decisions facing planners in Moscow became overwhelming. The cumbersome procedures for bureaucratic administration foreclosed the free communication and flexible response required at the enterprise level for dealing with worker alienation, innovation, customers, and suppliers. During 1975–1985, corruption and data fiddling became common practice among bureaucracy to report satisfied targets and quotas thus entrenching the crisis. At the same time, the effects of the central planning were progressively distorted due to the rapid growth of the second economy in the Soviet Union.

While all modernized economies were rapidly moving to computerization after 1965, the Soviet Union fell further and further behind. Moscow's decision to copy the IBM 360 of 1965 proved a decisive mistake, for it locked scientists into an antiquated system they were unable to improve. They had enormous difficulties in manufacturing the necessary chips reliably and in quantity, in programming workable and efficient programs, in coordinating entirely separate operations, and in providing support to computer users.

One of the greatest strengths of Soviet economy was its vast supplies of oil and gas; world oil prices quadrupled in the 1973–1974 and rose again in 1979–1981, making the energy sector the chief driver of the Soviet economy, and was used to cover multiple weaknesses. At one point, Soviet Premier Alexei Kosygin told the head of oil and gas production that "things are bad with bread. Give me 3 million tons [of oil] over the plan".

In 2007, economist and former Prime Minister Yegor Gaidar wrote the following about looking back to these three decades: 

Awareness of the growing crisis arose initially within the KGB which with its extensive network of informants in every region and institution had its finger on the pulse of the nation. Yuri Andropov, director of the KGB, created a secret department during the 1970s within the KGB devoted to economic analysis and when he succeeded Brezhnev in 1982 sounded the alarm forcefully to the Soviet leadership. However, Andropov's remedy of increased discipline proved ineffective. It was only when Andropov's protege Gorbachev assumed power that a determined, but ultimately unsuccessful, assault on the economic crisis was undertaken.

The value of all consumer goods manufactured in 1990 in retail prices was about 459 billion roubles ($2.1 trillion). According to CIA estimates, by 1989 the size of the Soviet economy was roughly half that in the United States.

Comparisons with other countries

See also 

 Second economy of the Soviet Union
 1965 Soviet economic reform
 1973 Soviet economic reform
 1979 Soviet economic reform
 
 
 
 Bureaucratic collectivism
 Administrative command economy
 Eastern Bloc economies
 Enterprises in the Soviet Union
 Five-year plans
 State Planning Committee
 Material balance planning
 Soviet Ministry of Finance
 
 Primitive socialist accumulation
 Soviet-type economic planning
 State capitalism
 State socialism
 Trade unions in the Soviet Union

References

Works cited

Further reading 

 Autio-Sarasmo, Sari. "Technological Modernisation in the Soviet Union and Post-Soviet Russia: Practices and Continuities." Europe-Asia Studies 68.1 (2016): 79-96.
 Bergson, Abram. The real national income of Soviet Russia since 1928  (1961) 
 Connolly, Richard. The Russian Economy: A Very Short Introduction (Oxford University Press, 2020). Online review

 
 Davies, R. W. Soviet economic development from Lenin to Khrushchev (1998) excerpt
 Davies, R. W. ed. From Tsarism to the New Economic Policy: Continuity and Change in the Economy of the USSR (London, 1990).
 Davies, R. W. ed. The Economic Transformation of the Soviet Union, 1913–1945 (Cambridge, 1994).
 Goldman, Marshall (1994). Lost Opportunity: Why Economic Reforms in Russia Have Not Worked. New York: W. W. Norton.
 
 Harrison, Mark. "The Soviet Union after 1945: Economic Recovery and Political Repression," Past & Present (2011 Supplement 6) Vol. 210 Issue suppl_6, p. 103–120.
 Goldman, Marshall (1991). What Went Wrong With Perestroika. New York: W. W. Norton.
 Kennedy, Paul. The Rise and Fall of the Great Powers (New York: Random House, 1987).
 
 Moser, Nat. Oil and the Economy of Russia: From the Late-Tsarist to the Post-Soviet Period (Routledge, 2017).
 Nove, Alec. An Economic History of the USSR, 1917–1991. (3rd ed. 1993) online free to borrow
 Ofer, Gur. "Soviet Economic Growth: 1928-1985," Journal of Economic Literature  (1987) 25#4: 1767-1833. online
 
 Rutland, Robert (1985). The Myth of the Plan: Lessons of Soviet Planning Experience. London: Hutchinson.

In Russian 
 Kara-Murza, Sergey (2004). Soviet Civilization: From 1917 to the Great Victory (in Russian) Сергей Кара-Мурза. Советская цивилизация. От начала до Великой Победы. .
 Kara-Murza, Sergey (2004). Soviet Civilization: From the Great Victory Till Our Time (in Russian). Сергей Кара-Мурза. Советская цивилизация. От Великой Победы до наших дней. .

External links 
 Andre Gunder Frank. "What Went Wrong in the 'Socialist' East?".

 
Soviet Union
Soviet Union
Collectivism
Planned Economies